Veronica rakaiensis, the Rakai hebe, is a species of flowering plant in the family Plantaginaceae, native to the South Island of New Zealand. As its synonym Hebe rakaiensis it has gained the Royal Horticultural Society's Award of Garden Merit.

References

rakaiensis
Endemic flora of New Zealand
Flora of the South Island
Plants described in 1881